Lot 63 is a township in Kings County, Prince Edward Island, Canada.  It is part of St. Andrew's Parish. Lot 63 was awarded to Hugh Palliser in the 1767 land lottery.

References

63
Geography of Kings County, Prince Edward Island